Sergio Cidoncha Fernández (born 27 August 1990) is a Spanish professional footballer who plays as an attacking midfielder.

Club career

Spain
Born in El Escorial, Madrid, Cidoncha was a product of local Atlético Madrid's youth ranks. He made his senior debut in the 2009–10 season with the C team, in the Tercera División. Two years later, he was promoted to the reserves in the Segunda División B.

On 25 July 2013, Cidoncha was loaned to Real Zaragoza, recently relegated to Segunda División. He made his debut in the competition on 17 August, in a 1–1 away draw against Hércules CF.

On 4 August 2014, Cidoncha signed a two-year deal with Albacete Balompié, newly promoted to the second tier. He opened his scoring account in the league on 23 November, his brace helping the hosts defeat CA Osasuna 2–0.

Cidoncha returned to division three in summer 2016, joining SD Ponferradina.

India
On 10 August 2018, 27-year-old Cidoncha moved abroad for the first time and signed with Indian Super League club Jamshedpur FC. He scored three goals in his only season, adding as many assists in a fifth-place finish.

Cidoncha moved to fellow league team Kerala Blasters FC on 12 June 2019, on a two-year contract. He scored his first goal for them on 1 December, in the first minute of an eventual 2–2 home draw with FC Goa. At the end of the campaign, he agreed to a one-year extension. 

On 18 November 2020, Cidoncha was named as one of the captains. Late in the same month, he was taken off the field in the last minutes of the fixture against Chennaiyin FC after a challenge from Enes Sipović; it was later confirmed that he had suffered a ligament injury to his right ankle, being expected to be on the sidelines for an extended period of time and eventually being replaced in the squad by his compatriot Juande.

Later career
Cidoncha returned to Spain on 27 August 2021, joining third-division Gimnástica Segoviana CF.

Club statistics

References

External links

1990 births
Living people
Spanish footballers
Footballers from the Community of Madrid
Association football midfielders
Segunda División players
Segunda División B players
Tercera División players
Segunda Federación players
Atlético Madrid C players
Atlético Madrid B players
Real Zaragoza players
Albacete Balompié players
SD Ponferradina players
Indian Super League players
Jamshedpur FC players
Kerala Blasters FC players
Spanish expatriate footballers
Expatriate footballers in India
Spanish expatriate sportspeople in India